The 1994 All-Ireland Under-21 Hurling Championship final was a hurling match that was played to determine the winners of the 1994 All-Ireland Under-21 Hurling Championship, the 31st season of the All-Ireland Under-21 Hurling Championship, a tournament organised by the Gaelic Athletic Association for the champion teams of the four provinces of Ireland. The final was contested by Kilkenny of Leinster and Galway of Connacht, with Kilkenny winning by 3-10 to 0-11.

Match

Details

References

1994 in hurling
All-Ireland Under-21 Hurling Championship Finals
Galway GAA matches
Kilkenny GAA matches